Un Paso del Amor is the debut album from Puerto Rican singer Ektor. Ektor was the second finalist of the first season of Puerto Rican talent show contest Objetivo Fama.

The album was released on August 23, 2005. The first single titled "Te Voy a Amar" was used in one of Univision's soap operas.

Track listings
 "Te Voy a Amar"
 "Mientras Tanto"
 "Templo de Metal"
 "Yo Soy el Mismo"
 "Un Paso del Amor"
 "Ya No Queda Nada"
 "Cuanto Duele Amar"
 "No Digas Que No"
 "Si Volviera a Nacer"
 "Es Amor"

External links
“A un paso del amor” su nueva producción discográfica “Te voy a amar” primer sencillo promociona

2005 debut albums
Spanish-language albums